Former Reformed Mennonite Church is a historic Reformed Mennonite church located at Amherst, New York in Erie County, New York.  It is a Greek Revival style structure constructed in 1834.  It served as a house of worship until 1981.  It is now occupied by an Evans Bank branch.

It was listed on the National Register of Historic Places in 2003.

References

External links
Reformed Mennonite Church, Former - U.S. National Register of Historic Places on Waymarking.com

Churches on the National Register of Historic Places in New York (state)
Greek Revival church buildings in New York (state)
Churches completed in 1834
19th-century churches in the United States
Churches in Erie County, New York
Mennonite church buildings in New York (state)
National Register of Historic Places in Erie County, New York